Włostów may refer to the following places:
Włostów, Gorzów County in Lubusz Voivodeship (west Poland)
Włostów, Żary County in Lubusz Voivodeship (west Poland)
Włostów, Świętokrzyskie Voivodeship (south-central Poland)